John Curteys was a carpenter and the member of the Parliament of England for Marlborough for multiple parliaments from February 1388 to 1395.

References 

Members of Parliament for Marlborough
English MPs February 1388
English carpenters
Year of birth unknown
Year of death unknown
English MPs 1395
English MPs September 1388
English MPs 1393
English MPs 1394